The African Parliamentary Union, formerly the Union of African Parliaments, is a continental interparliamentary organization first established in Abidjan on 13 February 1976. The Union aims to bring together the parliamentary institutions of all the nations of Africa, to encourage contacts among African and world parliamentarians, and to strengthen and promote democracy and peace. Forty parliaments are members of the APU.

The APU holds annual conferences in order to further its goals and also organizes parliamentary meetings in cooperation with International Organizations or Institutions.

The working languages of the Union are English, Arabic, French and Portuguese.

Members 

Non-members are Eritrea, Seychelles, Comoros, Mauritius, Madagascar, Tanzania, Zimbabwe, Malawi, Mozambique, Botswana, South Africa, Eswatini, Lesotho, and the Sahrawi Arab Democratic Republic.

See also 
 Pan-African Parliament

References 

Organizations based in Abidjan
Parliamentary assemblies